Brandon Couts (born February 17, 1979) is an American former sprinter. He was the 2002 National Indoor Champion in the 400 meters.  Couts coached sprints and hurdlers at the University of Colorado.

References

1979 births
Living people
American male sprinters
Universiade medalists in athletics (track and field)
Universiade gold medalists for the United States
Medalists at the 1999 Summer Universiade
Medalists at the 2001 Summer Universiade